Curse of the Forty-Niner (better known as Miner's Massacre) is a 2002 American slasher film directed by John Carl Buechler and starring Karen Black.

Plot
A group of explorers go hiking in the forests of northern California. They stumble upon an old mine and take a large amount of gold that they find. They do not know that the gold belonged to a miner named Jeremiah Stone (Vernon Wells), who died in the mine. He awakens from the dead and begins killing anyone who gets in the way of his gold.

Cast
 Karen Black - Aunt Nelly
 John Phillip Law - Sheriff Murphy
 Richard Lynch - Old Man Prichard
 Vernon Wells - Jeremiah Stone
 Martin Kove - Caleb
 Jeff Conaway - Reverend Sutter 
 Sean Hines - Nick Berman
 Carrie Bradac - Claire Berman 
 Kelsey Wedeen as Lilly Sutter

References

External links
 
 

2002 films
American horror films
Films directed by John Carl Buechler
Films set in California
Films about mining
Works about mining
2002 horror films
2000s English-language films
2000s American films